Saint-Martin-au-Laërt is a former commune in the Pas-de-Calais department in northern France. On 1 January 2016, it was merged into the new commune Saint-Martin-lez-Tatinghem.

Geography
Saint-Martin-au-Laërt is a farming and light industrial suburb to the northwest of Saint-Omer on the D928 and D923 roads.

Population
The inhabitants are called Saint-Martinois.

Places of interest
 The church of St.Martin, dating from the fifteenth century.
 The windmill tower, classified as an ancient monument.
 The Château de La Tour Blanche.

Administration

See also
Communes of the Pas-de-Calais department

References

Saintmartinaulaert